Vivette is a given name.

People with this name include:
Vivette Girault (born 1943), French mathematician
Vivette Glover (born 1942), British psychobiologist
Vivette J. Kady, Canadian writer, finalist for Journey Prize and Danuta Gleed Literary Award
Vivette Lewis, co-founder of Jamaican theatre group Sistren Theatre Collective
, Senator of Gard

Fictional characters and works with this name include:
Vivette, in L'Arlésienne (short story) and in the associated play, opera, film, and ballet
Vivette, in Buridan's Donkey (film)
Vivette, in Letters from My Windmill (film)
La Belle Vivette, rewritten libretto to the opera La belle Hélène
Vivette, novelette by Gelett Burgess

See also
Poncelet Vivette, airplane entered in the Lympne light aircraft trials
Vivette, ship in List of shipwrecks in 1899